Y is the debut studio album of English post-punk band The Pop Group. The album was produced by dub musician Dennis "Blackbeard" Bovell at Ridge Farm Studios in Surrey, and was released on 20 April 1979 through Radar Records.  It was reissued in 1996 by Radar, 2007 by Rhino/Radar (each with 1-2 bonus tracks from the "She Is Beyond Good and Evil" single), and in 2019 by Mute Records, including deluxe LP/12" and CD editions with bonus outtakes and live albums, to mark its 40th anniversary.

Y initially received mixed critical reviews but has since received acclaim. Pitchfork ranked it at number 35 on its list of The Top 100 Albums of the 1970s. The Wire included it in its list of "The 100 Most Important Records Ever Made".

Background and recording 
Inspired by the energy of punk rock but disillusioned by its musical traditionalism, The Pop Group initially set out as funk band, drawing influence from black dance music and radical political traditions. Soon after forming, they began to gain notoriety for their live performances, landing them a contract with Radar Records and a cover of the NME. They issued their debut single, "She Is Beyond Good and Evil" in early 1979.

To record their debut, the group teamed with British dub reggae producer Dennis Bovell. Critic Simon Reynolds wrote that "Bovell's mix of acid-rock wildness and dub wisdom made him [...] the ideal candidate for the not hugely enviable task of giving The Pop Group's unruly sound some semblance of cohesion," noting that he grounded the band's sound in its rhythm section while utilizing a variety of production effects. Writing for Fact, Mark Fisher characterized the album's sound as a "delirial montage of funk, free jazz, Jamaican audio-mancy and the avant-garde," describing it as "both carvernous and propulsive, ultra-abstract yet driven by dance music’s physical imperatives." He noted the "sonic alchemy" of Bovell's production work. PopMatters wrote that the group "sharpened the straightforward guitar lines of punk, the bounding throb of funk rhythms, and the sonic manipulation of dub and let them penetrate each other in ridiculously slapdash fashion."

Critical reception 

Upon its release, Y received mixed reviews. In 1979, the NME described it as "a brave failure. Exciting but exasperating." In recent years, the album has risen in critical estimations. Simon Reynolds called it "a heroic mess, glorious in its overreach." In 2008, Mark Fisher wrote "Joy Division’s Closer is often considered the crown jewel of post-punk, but Y – inchoate with potential, the fire to Joy Division’s ice – has an equal claim." Stylus Magazine called the album "a landmark of lunatic post-punk," writing that "these are political punk tunes deconstructed so that only the skeleton remains, and weaving between those bare bones are some of the nastiest sounds ever made."

In 2004, Pitchfork ranked Y at number 35 on its list of the greatest albums of the 1970s, saying that "unlike most of the late-70s' no-wave types (and perennial imitators), The Pop Group were less concerned with eschewing convention than with vehemently eviscerating it." PopMatters named it the 11th best post-punk album ever in 2017. The album has had a lasting impact, with artists such as the Minutemen, Primal Scream, Sonic Youth and Nick Cave citing the album as an influence on their work. Minutemen bassist Mike Watt commented that "The Pop Group said 'let’s take Funkadelic and put it with Beefheart. Why not?'"

Accolades 

(*) designates unordered lists.

Track listing 
Original album

2007 Rhino/Radar Reissue CD

1 and 11 are the A and B sides of the "She is Beyond Good and Evil" single.  The 1996 reissue CD and LP on Radar consists of tracks 1-10 above.

2019 Mute 40th Anniversary Reissues

The original album appears in all versions in its original track order, half-speed remastered at Abbey Road Studios.  The CD includes "She is Beyond Good and Evil" and "3'38" as tracks 10 and 11, while the LP and the deluxe and regular vinyl box sets include them as an extra 45 RPM 12" single, which was also half-speed remastered.  A limited edition cassette (its first legitimate release on that format) contains the album only, but the enclosed download code includes the single tracks.  Also included in the deluxe vinyl and CD sets (and reissued as stand alone vinyl LPs in 2020) were two extra related albums, with studio outtakes and live performances of the album's songs.  All the vinyl versions except the 2020 extras reissues include download cards for high-definition digital files of their respective audio contents.

Alien Blood

Y Live!

Personnel 
Adapted from the Y liner notes.

The Pop Group
 Gareth Sager – guitar, saxophone, piano
 Bruce Smith – drums, percussion
 Mark Stewart – vocals
 Simon Underwood – bass guitar
 John Waddington – guitar

Additional musicians
 Disc O'Dell – musical direction
Technical personnel
 Dennis Bovell – production
 Mike Dunne – engineering
 Brian Gaylor – assistant engineering
 Eddy Gorecki – mastering
 The Pop Group – production

Release history

References

External links 
 

1979 debut albums
The Pop Group albums
Radar Records albums